Saada District is a district of the Saada Governorate, Yemen. As of 2003, the district had a population of 58,695 people.

References

Districts of Saada Governorate
Saada Governorate